Mirosław Tłokiński (born 2 October 1955) is a Polish former professional footballer. He spent the majority of his early years playing in Poland, mainly for Widzew Łódź, before moving to Western Europe and playing for teams in France and Switzerland. During his career he mostly played as a forward, but was a versatile player and played in every outfield position during his career.

Senior career

Tłokiński started his career in the city of his birth, Gdynia, playing for Arka Gdynia over two seasons. At the age of 20 he joined Arka's bitter rivals Lechia Gdańsk. He was only with Lechia for a season, playing a total of 30 games in all competitions, scoring 4 goals. It was his next move which would see his most successful spell as a player. In 1976, Tłokiński joined Widzew Łódź, where he spent the next 7 years of his career. His time at Widzew coincided with the period which was known as their "Golden Generation". Widzew won their first ever Ekstraklasa title in 1981, and won the league for the second time the following season. Despite not winning the league the following season, Tłokiński did finish as the league's highest goalscorer. After his time in Poland, Tłokiński played with RC Lens in France, and went on to play for one more French team and four Swiss teams, before finally retiring in 1993 at the age of 38.

Honours

Widzew Łódź 
Ekstraklasa (2): 1980-81 & 1981-82

Individual
Top Goalscorer (1): Ekstraklasa 1982-82 (15 goals)

References

1955 births
Lechia Gdańsk players
Polish footballers
Association football forwards
Living people
Sportspeople from Gdynia
Widzew Łódź players
RC Lens players
CS Chênois players
Arka Gdynia players
Poland international footballers
Stade Rennais F.C. players